Aokigahara, also known as the , is a forest on the northwestern flank of Mount Fuji on the island of Honshu in Japan, thriving on  of hardened lava laid down by the last major eruption of Mount Fuji in 864 CE. The western edge of Aokigahara, where there are several caves that fill with ice in winter, is a popular destination for tourists and school trips. Parts of Aokigahara are very dense, and the porous lava rock absorbs sound, contributing to a sense of solitude that some visitors attribute to the forest.

The forest has a historical reputation as a home to yūrei: ghosts of the dead in Japanese mythology. At least since the 1960s, Aokigahara has become associated with suicide, eventually becoming known in English by the nickname "Suicide Forest" and gaining a reputation as one of the world's most-used suicide sites. Because of this, signs at the head of some trails urge suicidal visitors to think of their families and contact a suicide prevention association.

Geography

The forest floor mostly consists of volcanic rock. Designated trails lead to several tourist attractions such as the Narusawa Ice Cave, Fugaku Wind Cave and Lake Sai Bat Cave which are three larger lava caves near Mount Fuji, the ice cave being frozen year-round.

Aokigahara has been falsely portrayed as a place where navigational compasses go haywire. Needles of magnetic compasses will move if placed directly on the lava, aligning with the rock's natural magnetism, which varies in iron content and strength by location. However, a compass behaves as expected when held at a normal height. The Japan Ground Self-Defense Force has conducted its ranger courses including navigation training in the forest since 1956.

Flora and fauna
Mammals include the Asian black bear, small Japanese mole, bats, mice, deer, fox, boar, wild rabbit, Japanese mink and Japanese squirrel. Birds include great tit, willow tit, long-tailed tit, great spotted woodpecker, pygmy woodpecker, bush warbler, Eurasian jay, Japanese white-eye, Japanese thrush, brown-headed thrush, Siberian thrush, Hodgson's hawk-cuckoo, Japanese grosbeak, lesser cuckoo, black-faced bunting, oriental turtle dove, and common cuckoo.

There are ground beetles and other insects, including many species of butterflies, even in the forest interior Argynnis paphia, Chrysozephyrus smaragdinus, Celastrina argiolus, Celastrina sugitanii, Curetis acuta, Favonius jezoensis, Neptis sappho, Parantica sita and Polygonia c-album are found.

The forest has a variety of conifers and broadleaf trees and shrubs including: Chamaecyparis obtusa, Cryptomeria japonica, Pinus densiflora, Pinus parviflora, Tsuga sieboldii, Acer distylum, Acer micranthum, Acer sieboldianum, Acer tschonoskii, Betula grossa, Chengiopanax sciadophylloides (as Acanthopanax sciadophylloides a.k.a. Eleutherococcus sciadophylloides), Clethra barbinervis, Enkianthus campanulatus, Euonymus macropterus, Ilex pedunculosa, Ilex macropoda, Pieris japonica, Prunus jamasakura, Quercus mongolica var. crispula, Rhododendron dilatatum, Skimmia japonica f. repens, Sorbus commixta (as Sorbus americana ssp. japonica) and Toxicodendron trichocarpum (as Rhus trichocarpa). The dominant tree species between 1,000 and 1,800 metres of altitude is Tsuga diversifolia and from 1,800 to 2,200 metres is Abies veitchii.

Deeper in the forest there are many herbaceous flowering plants including Artemisia princeps, Cirsium nipponicum var. incomptum, Corydalis incisa, Erigeron annuus, Geranium nepalense, Kalimeris pinnatifida, Maianthemum dilatatum, Oplismenus undulatifolius and Reynoutria japonica (syn. Polygonum cuspidatum). There are also the myco-heterotrophic Monotropastrum humile, frequent liverworts, many mosses and many ferns. The forest edges have many more species.

Suicides
Aokigahara is sometimes referred to as the most popular site for suicide in Japan. In 2003, 105 bodies were found in the forest, exceeding the previous record of 78 in 2002. In 2010, the police recorded more than 200 people having attempted suicide in the forest, of whom 54 completed. Suicides are said to increase during March, the end of the fiscal year in Japan. As of 2011, the most common means of suicide in the forest were hanging or drug overdose. In recent years, local officials have stopped publicizing the numbers in an attempt to decrease Aokigahara's association with suicide.

The rate of suicide has led officials to place a sign at the forest's entry urging suicidal visitors to seek help and not take their own lives. Annual body searches have been conducted by police, volunteers, and journalists since 1970.

The site's popularity has been attributed to Seichō Matsumoto's 1961 novel Nami no Tō (Tower of Waves). However, the history of suicide in Aokigahara predates the novel's publication, and the place has long been associated with death; ubasute may have been practiced there into the nineteenth century, and the forest is reputedly haunted by the yūrei of those left to die.

References in media

Aokigahara has been referred to in several media, including anime and manga, films, literature, music, and video games.

The 2015 film The Sea of Trees with Matthew McConaughey, Ken Watanabe and Naomi Watts also tells a story happening there, as does the 2016 horror film The Forest.

During late 2017 and early 2018, the Logan Paul suicide forest controversy began with a YouTube video showing the Aokigahara forest, in which Paul showed the body of a suicide victim on camera, that shocked many viewers and brought widespread condemnation.

It was the subject of a BBC Radio 4 production (first broadcast 10 September 2018) in which four poets traveled to Aokigahara to write and record poetry in the forest.

The poets Arai Takako, Jordan A. Y. Smith, Osaki Sayaka, and Yotsumoto Yasuhiro co-authored a bilingual (Japanese/English) anthology of the poems and short writings on Aokigahara, titled Sea of Trees: Poetic Gateways to Aokigahara (ToPoJo Excursions, 2019).

An American playwright of Japanese ancestry, Kristine Haruna Lee, wrote and staged a play, Suicide Forest, in New York City in March 2019. It addressed suicide in America and Japan, referencing the Aokigahara Forest.

See also
Copycat suicide
List of suicide sites
Lover's Leap
Suicide bridge

References

External links

Aokigahara Forest information
 (Vice.com)
 
 

Forests of Japan
Fuji-Hakone-Izu National Park
Fujikawaguchiko, Yamanashi
Geography of Yamanashi Prefecture
Lava flows
Mount Fuji
Narusawa, Yamanashi
Reportedly haunted locations in Japan
Suicides in Japan
Tourist attractions in Yamanashi Prefecture